Haulashore Island is a small island in Tasman Bay / Te Tai-o-Aorere, near Nelson, New Zealand. Formed in 1901, it was at one time a part of Boulder Bank. There is a narrow channel between the island and Arrow Rock. The  island has had rabbits since its formation; ferrets were released on the island in the 1960s to control the rabbit population.

References

Geography of Nelson, New Zealand
Islands of the Nelson Region